Everett J. Lake (February 8, 1871 – September 16, 1948) was an American politician and businessman who served as the 67th governor of Connecticut.

Early life
Lake was born in Woodstock, Connecticut, on February 8, 1871, son of Thomas A. Lake and Martha A. Cockings Lake. He studied at Worcester Polytechnic and graduated in 1890. He then attended Harvard University, where he played for the Harvard Crimson football team. He received consensus All-American football honors in 1891. He graduated from Harvard in 1892.

Lake married three times. His first wife was Eva Louise Sykes, whom he married on September 4, 1895, and with whom he had a son and a daughter, Marjorie S. Lake. Eva Lake died on November 25, 1935, in Boston. Her body was brought back to Connecticut for burial in Cedar Hill Cemetery in Hartford.

After Eva's death, Lake married Mrs. Elizabeth (Keeney) Gordon, the widow of Lewis E. Gordon, on December 24, 1935. She died on August 28, 1936, in Whitefield, New Hampshire, and is also buried in the Cedar Hill Cemetery. Lake's third wife was Barbara Grace Lincoln, a prominent business woman and director of the Sage-Allen store in Hartford. Surviving him by twenty years, Barbara died June 16, 1968, and is buried beside Lake in Ashford.

Career
Lake started his career by working for the Hartford Lumber Company, his father's business. He was the president of Hartford Lumber Company from 1900 to 1939. A Republican, Lake became a representative from Hartford in the Connecticut House of Representatives from 1903 to 1905. He also served as a member of the Connecticut Senate from 1905 to 1907.

Lake became the 72nd lieutenant governor of Connecticut under Rollin S. Woodruff in 1907. He held that position until 1909. He was a delegate to the Republican National Convention from Connecticut in 1912. At the 1920 state convention he supported the nomination of William H. Hall, a close friend. When the delegates became deadlocked over whom to select for governor, Lake was nominated. Not only did he win his party's support, but he also received more votes at the polls than any gubernatorial candidate had ever obtained before, defeating Democratic candidate Rollin U. Tyler by 110,880 votes.

Elected in 1920, Lake became the governor of Connecticut. During his term, a bill was enacted that prohibited child laborers from working more than eight hours a day. A legislation also was constituted that withheld employment certificates from children who were deficient in required schooling.

In 1921 Lake was elected as an honorary member of the Connecticut Society of the Cincinnati.

When Lake left office on January 3, 1923, he continued to work with the Hartford Lumber Company as well as participate in many civic and private organizations. His interest in football did not diminish, and he continued to attend Harvard–Yale games. In 1939, he retired as the president of the Hartford Lumber Company after 39 years.

Death
Lake died in Hartford, Connecticut, on September 16, 1948. He is interred at Westford Village Cemetery, Ashford, Windham County, Connecticut.

Head coaching record

References

Further reading
 Sobel, Robert and John Raimo. Biographical Directory of the Governors of the United States, 1789-1978. Greenwood Press, 1988.

External links
 The Political Graveyard
 

1871 births
1948 deaths
19th-century players of American football
All-American college football players
American football halfbacks
Republican Party governors of Connecticut
Harvard Crimson football coaches
Trinity Bantams football coaches
Harvard Crimson football players
Players of American football from Connecticut
American Congregationalists
People from Woodstock, Connecticut